William Frederick Halsey (April 11, 1853 – June 11, 1920) was a United States naval officer. He is the father of William Halsey Jr., one of only four American naval officers to obtain the five-star rank of Fleet Admiral.

Biography

Early life
William Frederick Halsey was born on April 11, 1853, in New York, New York, the son of Eliza Grace (King) and Charles Henry Halsey. He was a descendant of United States Senator Rufus King.  He was appointed to the United States Naval Academy from Louisiana and entered naval service a midshipman at the Naval Academy in September 1869.

Career
During the Spanish–American War the Newark served as the flagship of Commodore John C. Watson during the engagement of Aguadores and as part of the fleet blockading Santiago, Cuba. That September, he received orders to the Naval Academy.

In 1898 he became a member of the Pennsylvania Commandery of the Military Order of Foreign Wars.

Halsey was promoted to commander in 1902 and served as head of the Department of Seamanship at the United States Naval Academy.

Halsey was promoted to the rank of captain in 1906.  He retired from the Navy, at his own request, on June 30, 1907, but continued to serve on active duty at the Bureau of Construction and Repair until 1919.

Death
He died on June 11, 1920 and was buried in Arlington National Cemetery.  His wife Anne, who died on May 25, 1947, is buried with him, and his son, Fleet Admiral William "Bull" Halsey, Jr. (October 30, 1882-August 16, 1959) is buried beside him.

Personal life
He married Anne Masters Brewster and on October 30, 1882. Their son, future World War II hero Bull Halsey, was born in Elizabeth, New Jersey.

Dates of Rank
 Midshipman – September 22, 1869
 Passed Midshipman – May 1872
 Ensign – 16 July 1874
 Master – March 18, 1880
 Lieutenant – March 4, 1886
 Lieutenant Commander – March 3, 1899
 Commander – November 2, 1902
 Captain – September 12, 1906

References

 Dates of promotion from The Records of Living Officers of the U.S. Navy and Marine Corps, Sixth Edition, 1889, by Lewis Randolph Hamersly.

1853 births
1920 deaths
Burials at Arlington National Cemetery

United States Naval Academy alumni
Naval War College alumni
United States Navy officers
American military personnel of the Spanish–American War